Indra  Kumar Meghwal was a nine year old Dalit boy studying in a  Saraswati Vidya Mandir school in Surana village  in Jalore Rajasthan ,India. He died after being hit by teacher Chail Singh for drinking Water from a pot used only by upper castes. 

On August 19, 2022, Dalit groups staged protests and demonstrations demanding justice for the victim's family.

References

2022 murders in India
Dalit history
August 2022 events in India
Caste-related violence in India
Lists of school-related attacks
Social issues in India
Discrimination in India
Caste system in India
Caste-based discrimination in Indian education
Drinking water
Crime in Rajasthan